Klaus Petersen (born 18 February 1951) is a Danish modern pentathlete. He competed at the 1972 and 1976 Summer Olympics.

References

1951 births
Living people
Danish male modern pentathletes
Olympic modern pentathletes of Denmark
Modern pentathletes at the 1972 Summer Olympics
Modern pentathletes at the 1976 Summer Olympics